Mary Jerrold (4 December 1877 – 3 March 1955) was an English actress. She was married to actor Hubert Harben, and mother of actress Joan Harben and celebrity chef Philip Harben.

She made her London stage debut as Prudence Dering in Mary Pennington Spinster (1896); and played Martha Brewster for three and a half years in the original West End production of Arsenic and Old Lace, opening in 1942. In 1922, in a stage production of Jane Austen's Pride and Prejudice, Jerrold became one of the oldest actresses cast as Elizabeth Bennet, at age 44. In the play, she acted opposite her husband, cast as Mr. Collins. She appeared in Molly Keane's Ducks and Drakes in 1941. In 1946 she starred in the West End melodrama But for the Grace of God by Frederick Lonsdale. In 1951 she played the lead role in Kenneth Horne's comedy And This Was Odd at the Criterion Theatre. In 1953 she appeared in A Day by the Sea by N.C. Hunter.

Partial filmography

 Disraeli (1916) - Lady Beaconsfield
 A Sinless Sinner (1919) - Mary Hendon
 Candytuft, I Mean Veronica (1921) - Mrs. Anstruther
 The W Plan (1930) - Frau Muller
 The Sport of Kings (1931) - Mrs. Purdie
 Alibi - Mrs. Ackroyd
 The Shadow Between (1931) - Mrs. Maddox
 The Last Coupon (1932) - Polly Carter
 Blind Spot (1932) - Mrs. Herriott
 Perfect Understanding (1933) - Mrs. Graham
 Friday the Thirteenth (1933) - Flora Wakefield
 The Lash (1934) - Margaret Haughton
 The Great Defender (1934) - Mrs. Hammond
 Doctor's Orders (1934) - Mary Blake
 Spring in the Air (1934) - Albertina
 The Price of Wisdom (1935) - Mary Temple
 Fighting Stock (1935) - Emmie
 The Tunnel (1935) - Minor Role (uncredited)
 Jack of All Trades (1936) - Mrs. Warrender
 Saturday Night Revue (1937) - Mrs. Dorland
 Jamaica Inn (1939) - Miss Black (uncredited)
 Inspector Hornleigh on Holiday (1939) - Mrs. Adeline Bracer (uncredited)
 Return to Yesterday (1940) - Old Lady at station
 The Man at the Gate (1941) - Mary Foley
 Talk About Jacqueline (1942) - Aunt Helen
 The Gentle Sex (1943) - Mrs. Sheridan
 The Flemish Farm (1943) - Mme. Duclos
 The Way Ahead (1944) - Mrs. Gillingham
 The Magic Bow (1946) - Teresa Paganini
 The Ghosts of Berkeley Square (1947) - Lettie
 Bond Street (1948) - Miss Slennett
 Colonel Bogey (1948) - Aunt Mabel
 Mr. Perrin and Mr. Traill (1948) - Mrs. Perrin
 Woman Hater (1948) - Lady Datchett
 The Queen of Spades (1949) - Old Varvarushka
 Marry Me! (1949) - Emily Parsons
 She Shall Have Murder (1950) - Mrs. Robjohn
 Meet Me Tonight (1952) - Nanny (segment "Ways and Means")
 Top of the Form (1953) - Mrs. Bagshot

References

External links
 
 National Portrait Gallery: Mary Jerrold by Bassano

1877 births
1955 deaths
English film actresses
English silent film actresses
English stage actresses
English television actresses
Actresses from London
20th-century English actresses